Coryphopterus punctipectophorus, the spotted goby, is a species of goby found in the Western Atlantic Ocean.  

References

Gobiidae
Fish of the Atlantic Ocean
Fish described in 1960
Taxa named by Victor G. Springer